Open Minds – A Birla School, Hyderabad is managed by DSR Educational Society. The motto of the DSR group is to create a positive and inspiring space for the students. The school provides both Central Board of Secondary Education CBSE and Cambridge Assessment International Education CAIE syllabus for the primary, middle and secondary grade students.

Exams
The academic year starts mid-June and ends in early April and is divided into three quarters. Examinations are held at the end of every quarter and every month. Regular assignments and Quarterly reports are given to all students and parent-teacher meetings are held to enable parents and teachers to interact.

Campus features and facilities
The campus of the school occupies 10 acres. Open Minds offers a wide variety of sports facilities.

School ceremonies and traditions
 Investiture Ceremony 
At the beginning of every academic year, the newly elected School Student Cabinet and class leaders, house leaders take the oath of office in a colourful yet solemn Investiture ceremony.  The School Pupil Leaders for Boys and Girls make their maiden speech on this occasion. The investiture ceremony for the 2017–2018 academic year took place on 7 July 2017.

 Independence Day
Independence day is celebrated very grandly. There are inter-house cultural competitions and each house is given a topic to perform- usually related to the theme "India" and then the winners are declared. This is the day for the Cabinet to show off their abilities.

 Teachers' Day
5 September of every year is celebrated as Teachers' Day all over India in the memory of former President Dr. Sarvepalli Radhakrishnan. In what is probably the most festive celebration of the year, students show their appreciation to their teachers. Sports and games are held for the teachers and prizes are given away. Every classroom has an individual celebration for about an hour before the whole school assembles to celebrate the event. The organization of the event in its entirety is taken up by the School Cabinet and the Class Leaders.

 Children's Day
14 November of every year, the Children's Day marking the birth day of the first Prime minister of the Independent India, Pundit Jawarhar Lal Nehru is celebrated by the school with fun filled acts performed by the staff of the school itself. Prize distribution to the students won in literary and cultural competitions held though the year are awarded.

Christmas Celebrations
Every year by mid December, Christmas celebrations are carried on in the school premises where students enact a play describing the birth of Jesus Christ.

Republic Day
On 26 January, the Republic Day Celebrations are done in the school with the flag hoisting and a march past drill by the House Leaders, Class Leaders and the school cabinet itself along with the NCC contingent of the school.

See also
Education in India
List of schools in India
Delhi Public School

References

External links
 Official website
 
 

Private schools in Hyderabad, India
2013 establishments in Andhra Pradesh
Educational institutions established in 2013